Outland 2 is a collaborative album by Bill Laswell and Pete Namlook, released on April 9, 1996 by FAX +49-69/450464.

Track listing

Personnel 
Adapted from the Outland 2 liner notes.
Musicians
Bill Laswell – electronics
Pete Namlook – electronics, producer
Technical personnel
Oz Fritz – recording
Thi-Linh Le – cover art

Release history

References

External links 
 Outland 2 at Bandcamp
 

1996 albums
Collaborative albums
Bill Laswell albums
Pete Namlook albums
FAX +49-69/450464 albums
Albums produced by Pete Namlook